Sbonginhlanhla Makhaye (born 10 January 1997) is a South African cricketer. He made his List A debut for KwaZulu-Natal in the 2016–17 CSA Provincial One-Day Challenge on 31 October 2016.

References

External links
 

1997 births
Living people
South African cricketers
KwaZulu-Natal cricketers
Place of birth missing (living people)